Tridentifrons is a genus of moths of the family Noctuidae.

Species
 Tridentifrons insularis Warren, 1912

References
Natural History Museum Lepidoptera genus database
Tridentifrons at funet

Hadeninae